Conroy Maddox (27 December 1912 – 14 January 2005) was an English surrealist painter, collagist, writer and lecturer; and a key figure in the Birmingham Surrealist movement.

He was born in Ledbury, Herefordshire, and discovered surrealism in 1935, spending the rest of his life exploring its potential through his paintings, collages, photographs, objects and texts. Inspired by artists such as Max Ernst, Óscar Domínguez and Salvador Dalí, he rejected academic painting in favour of techniques that expressed the surrealistic spirit of rebellion. Maddox officially joined the British Surrealist Group in 1938.

His creations soon began not only to challenge the conventional view of reality, but also to push pictorial expression to the limits of consciousness. He was even implicated in both scandal and controversy when, during World War II, Scotland Yard suspected him of fifth columnist sabotage and mounted a surprise raid to seize works thought to contain coded messages to the enemy.

Following the war he moved to Balsall Heath and began his most active period.
In 1948, he married Nan Burton. They had a daughter and a son together, but had the marriage dissolved in 1955. He died in London, aged 92.

Exhibitions

 1938 - Wertheim Gallery, London
 1940 - London Gallery, London
 1940 - Surrealism Today, Zwemmer Gallery, London
 1940 - Artists International Association
 1945 - Leicester Galleries, London
 1947 - International Surrealist Exhibition, Paris
 1949 - Royal Birmingham Society of Artists Galleries
 1949 - Bilston Corporation Art Gallery
 1951 - Royal Birmingham Society of Artists Galleries
 1963 - Grabowski Gallery, London
 1967 - Zwemmer Gallery, London
 1967 - Exeter City Gallery, Exeter
 1973 - Hamet Gallery, London
 1976 - Gouaches of the 1940s, Fischer Fine Art, London
 1978 - Surrealism Unlimited, Camden Arts Centre, London
 1982 - Peinture Surrealiste en Angleterre 1930-1960, Galerie 1900–2000, Paris
 1994 - Paintings and Objects, Gallery M, London
 2000 - Surrealism in Birmingham 1935-1955, Birmingham Museums
 2001 - Conroy Maddox. A Surrealist Odyssey, Belgrave Gallery, London

Bibliography

 Free Unions - Unions Libre - edited by Simon Watson Taylor and with cover by Conroy Maddox (1946)
 Dali by Conroy Maddox (Taschen)

References
 The Scandalous Eye: The Surrealism of Conroy Maddox by Silvano Levy, Liverpool University Press, 2003, 292 pages, .

External links
 Obituary from The Independent newspaper (UK) by Peter Davies, 15 January 2005
 Obituary from The Times newspaper (UK), 17 January 2005
 Obituary from the Daily Telegraph newspaper (UK), 21 January 2005
 Conroy Maddox at the Tate Gallery
 Interview National Life Stories

1912 births
2005 deaths
20th-century English painters
English male painters
21st-century English painters
British surrealist artists
People from Ledbury
20th-century English male artists
21st-century English male artists